Jeff Smith was an Australian rugby league coach.  He coached  Western Suburbs in the New South Wales Rugby League (NSWRL) competition.

Coaching career
Smith began his coaching career with Western Suburbs in 1948, a year after Frank Burge had taken the club to the finals.  Smith guided Wests to the 1948 minor premiership only losing two games throughout the home-and-away season. Western Suburbs would go on to reach the grand final against Balmain. In the grand final, Western Suburbs prevailed 8–5 at the Sydney Sports Ground winning their third premiership. Smith joined unique company being one of the few coaches to win a premiership in their first season.

In 1949, Smith stepped down as head coach for one season and was replaced by Col Maxwell. In 1950, Smith returned as head coach.  Smith guided Wests to fourth place and qualified them for the finals. Western Suburbs would go on to reach the 1950 NSWRFL grand final against South Sydney.  Souths would go on to win the match 21–15.  

In 1951, Smith again guided Western Suburbs to the finals.  Western Suburbs would go on to be eliminated by Manly-Warringah 9–37 in the semi final at the Sydney Cricket Ground.  This was Smith's last game as head coach and he stepped down following the defeat.  The following year, Western Suburbs would go on to win their fourth and final premiership.

References

Australian rugby league coaches
Western Suburbs Magpies coaches
Year of birth missing
Year of death missing
Place of birth missing
Place of death missing